Arthur Patrick Moynihan (1924–2001) was an Australian rugby league footballer who played in the 1940s.

Background
Moynihan was born in Sydney on 25 January 1924.

Playing career
Moynihan was a reserve grade player for South Sydney that was elevated to first grade for four games during the 1949 NSWRFL season. He is remembered as playing in the 1949 Grand Final as the Five-Eighth.

Death
Moynihan died at Greenwich, New South Wales on 18 February 2001.

References

South Sydney Rabbitohs players
1924 births
Australian rugby league players
2001 deaths
Rugby league five-eighths
Rugby league players from Sydney